Now That's What I Call: R&B is a double-disc compilation album released On September 26, 2011.

Now R&B features four songs which reached number one on the UK Singles Chart: "No Regrets", "Don't Go", "Don't Wanna Go Home" and "Party Rock Anthem".

Track listing

Disc 1

Disc 2

Charts

Release history

References

2011 compilation albums
RandB
Sony Music compilation albums
EMI Records compilation albums
Universal Music Group compilation albums
Warner Music Group compilation albums